Probable O-sialoglycoprotein endopeptidase is an enzyme that in humans is encoded by the OSGEP gene.

References

Further reading